Dasara Bullodu is a 1971 Indian Telugu-language romance film, produced and directed by V. B. Rajendra Prasad. It stars Akkineni Nageswara Rao, Vanisri and Chandrakala, with music composed by K. V. Mahadevan. It is the first film of Rajendra Prasad as a director. The film was a blockbuster at the box office and  remained  an all time  superhit in Telugu  film history.  It is considered  to  be one of the biggest hits of ANR. It ran for  100 days  at 25 theatres and went on to record a 200-day run at 4 centres. It was the first non-mythological film in Telugu to run for over 200 days. It had the unique distinction of celebrating 200 days run in all the three regions of the undivided Andhra Pradesh, first film to do so. It was remade in Hindi as Raaste Pyar Ke (1982) under the same banner and director.

Plot
The film begins in a village where  Gopi, a breezy and jovial guy, well known as Dasara Bullodu was reared by his elder brother Vasu and sister-in-law Yashoda (Anjali Devi). President Bhushiah a wise person, is their paternal uncle who has been separated from his elder brother on the provocation of his shrewish wife Bullemma. Bullaiah a devious and materialistic person is the brother of Bullemma, who fixes his daughter Nirmala's (Chandrakala) alliance with Gopi to usurp his wealth and she also loves him a lot. But Gopi loves Radha, sister of Yashoda and close friend to Nirmala too. At present, Nirmala is diagnosed with cancer, simultaneously, she realizes the love affair of Gopi and Radha and decides to sacrifice her love. Now Bullaiah wants to immediately couple up Nirmala with Gopi as a hope that she may recover due to deep affection for Gopi. At the same time, Bullaiah notices the closeness of Gopi and Radha, so he plots by splitting Gopi from Vasu and threatens Radha to keep out the way. Being cognizant to Nirmala's condition, Radha promises to do so and also convinces Gopi to marry Nirmala. Here Vasu engages Radha with Gopi's close friend Bodibabu. Meanwhile, Gopi and Nirmala's wedding arrangements are also made. During the time of the wedding, Bodibabu plans to unite Gopi and Radha, knowing it, Bullaiah intrigues by setting fire to the venue when Gopi rescues all. At last, terminally ill Nirmala breathes her last happily, uniting Gopi and Radha.

Cast
Akkineni Nageswara Rao as Gopi
Vanisri as Radha
Chandrakala as Nirmala
S. V. Ranga Rao as Bhushaiah
Gummadi as Vasu
Nagabhushanam as Bullaiah
Padmanabham as Bodi Babu
Raavi Kondala Rao as priest
Anjali Devi as Yashoda
Suryakantham as Bullamma
Chhaya Devi as Aademma
Radha Kumari as Nirmala's mother
Jhansi as Kantamma
Baby Rani as Chitti

Soundtrack

The film's music was composed by K. V. Mahadevan. The lyrics were written by Acharya Aatreya. Music released on SAREGAMA Audio Company.

References

External links

Indian romantic drama films
Films scored by K. V. Mahadevan
Telugu films remade in other languages
1970s Telugu-language films
1971 directorial debut films
Films directed by V. B. Rajendra Prasad